Bigger & Better is an album by saxophonist David Newman featuring performances recorded in 1968 for the Atlantic label.

Reception

Allmusic awarded the album 3 stars stating "The sessions that resulted in Bigger & Better feature Newman with a string section and studio musicians for forgettable versions of two Beatles songs, a pair of Sam Cooke R&B pieces and a couple of lesser items".

Track listing
 "Yesterday" (John Lennon, Paul McCartney) - 4:03
 "And I Love Her" (Lennon, McCartney) - 5:46
 "The Thirteenth Floor" (David Newman) - 5:56
 "Ain't That Good News" (Sam Cooke) - 3:46
 "A Change Is Gonna Come" (Cooke) - 5:35
 "For Sylvia" (William S. Fischer) - 6:43

Personnel 
David Newman - tenor saxophone, alto saxophone, flute
Melvin Lastie (tracks 1-5), Joe Newman (tracks 1 & 2), Jimmy Owens (tracks 3-5) - trumpet
Benny Powell - trombone (tracks 1-5)
Seldon Powell - tenor saxophone (tracks 1-5)
Henry Haywood (tracks 1 & 2), Jerome Richardson (tracks 3-5) - baritone saxophone
George Stubbs - piano (track 6)
Billy Butler (tracks 1, 2 & 6), Eric Gale (tracks 3-6) - guitar 
Richard Davis - bass (tracks 1-5)
Chuck Rainey - electric bass
Bernard Purdie - drums
Winston Collymore, Leo Cruczek, Richard Elias, Emanuel Green, Leo Kahn, Gene Orloff, Matthew Raimondi - violin (tracks 1-3, 5 7 6)
Alfred Brown, Selwart Clarke - viola (tracks 1-3, 5 & 6) 
Kermit Moore - cello (tracks 1-3, 5 & 6)

References 

1968 albums
David "Fathead" Newman albums
Albums produced by Joel Dorn
Atlantic Records albums